Anandache Jhaad is a Marathi film released on 13 October 2006. The film has been directed by Sanjay Surkar and produced by Smita Talwalkar.

Cast 
The film stars Vihang Nayak, Suhas Joshi, Sunil Barve, Shilpa Tulaskar, Prashant Damle, Viju Khote and Prashant Dharia.

Soundtrack
The music has been directed by Ashok Patki. Singer Geeta Masurekar makes a debut in Marathi with two songs.

Track listing

References

External links 
 Movie Details - ondemand.erosentertainment.com
 Chaukat Raja director dies while shooting film - dnaindia.com

2006 films
2000s Marathi-language films
Films directed by Sanjay Surkar